F.W. Johnson Collegiate is a high school situated in the Glencairn neighbourhood of east Regina, Saskatchewan, Canada. A part of Regina Public Schools, the school was named after Frederick W. Johnson, the 16th lieutenant governor of Saskatchewan. The school's academic program operates based on a differentiated instruction model.

Johnson's 600 students hail primarily from the Glencairn area of the city. It currently has four main feeder schools: Dr. George Ferguson School, Glen Elm School, Henry Braun School and Judge Bryant School.

Affiliated communities
 Glencairn (pop. 12,820)
 Glen Elm (pop. 3,235)

Notable alumni
 Jamie Heward, retired NHL defenceman 
 Shiloh, singer

References

External links
F.W. Johnson Collegiate

High schools in Regina, Saskatchewan
Educational institutions established in 1985
1985 establishments in Saskatchewan